Espion, lève-toi 1982 is a French spy thriller film directed by Yves Boisset about a sleeper agent in Zurich, based on the thriller Chance Awakening (1977) by George Markstein.

This film was first supposed to be directed by Andrzej Żuławski, but in the end it was Yves Boisset who did it. This was the second time that Yves Boisset worked together with Ennio Morricone, after their 1972 film Plot.

Awards 
 1982 – Nomination for best film at Mystfest

Cast and roles
 Lino Ventura - Sébastien Grenier
 Michel Piccoli - Jean-Paul Chance
 Bruno Cremer - Alain Richard
 Bernard Fresson - Henri Marchand
 Marc Mazza - Ramos Bavila
 Roger Jendly - Le commissaire Lohmann
 Heinz Bennent - Meyer
 Krystyna Janda - Anna Gretz, compagne de Sébastien Grenier
 Beate Kopp - La secrétaire de Grenier
 Christian Baltauss - Le bibliothécaire
 Kurt Bigger - Alfred Zimmer
 Jean-Paul Franky - Rudy la blonde
 Yves Boisset - L'adjoint de Richard
 Daniel Plancherel - L'inspecteur Vogel
 Philippe Brizard - Le collaborateur de Grenier

Crew 
 Director: Yves Boisset
 First Assistant Director:Urs Egger
 Script: Yves Boisset, Michel Audiard and Claude Veillot
 Producert: Norbert Saada for Cathala Productions and TF1 Films Productions
 Production manager: Georges Vallon, Marcel Just
 Music: Ennio Morricone
 Camera: Jean Boffety, Pierre-William Glenn
 Editor: Albert Jurgenson, Jean-François Naudon
 Art director: Serge Douy
 Set decorator,: André Labussière
 Special effects: Daniel Braunschweig
 Propmaster: Daniel Garbade
 Make-up artist: Christiane Sauvage
 Sound: Pierre Lenoir, Denis Carquin

References

External links
 IMDb entry

1982 films
Cold War spy films
Films directed by Yves Boisset
Films set in Zürich
French spy thriller films
Films with screenplays by Michel Audiard
Films shot in Switzerland
Films shot in Munich
Films shot in Zürich
1980s French films